Wylye is a village and civil parish in Wiltshire, England.

Wylye may also refer to:

 Wylye railway station, serving the village
 River Wylye, Wiltshire, England

See also
 Wiley (disambiguation)
 Wily (disambiguation)
 Wylie (disambiguation)
 Wyllie
 Wyle (disambiguation)
 Wyly